Daniel Wansi (born February 22, 1982 in Yaoundé) is a Cameroonian football striker.

Career
Wansi was trailed at Xiamen Lanshi in February 2006. He then played for Shenzhen Kingway. In December 2007 he moved to Montenegrin First League most popular club FK Budućnost Podgorica. He had already played in the region of ex-Yugoslavia when in autumn 2003 played in Croatian First League club Inker Zaprešić, nowadays known by a slightly different name, as NK Inter Zaprešić.

When he was nineteen and still playing in Cameroon's Cintra Yaoundé, he won the 2001 "Crack d’Or", best Cameroon's footballer of the year.

Daniel Wansi was part of the Cameroon team that won the 2003 All-Africa Games.

References

External sources
 Stats from 1HNL at HRrepka.

1982 births
Living people
Cameroonian footballers
Cameroonian expatriate footballers
Étoile Sportive du Sahel players
NK Inter Zaprešić players
Dynamo Dresden players
Shenzhen F.C. players
Chinese Super League players
Al-Nasr SC (Dubai) players
R.A.E.C. Mons players
FK Budućnost Podgorica players
Association football forwards
Expatriate footballers in Tunisia
Expatriate footballers in Croatia
Expatriate footballers in the United Arab Emirates
Expatriate footballers in Germany
Cameroonian expatriate sportspeople in Belgium
Expatriate footballers in China
Cameroonian expatriate sportspeople in the United Arab Emirates
Cameroonian expatriate sportspeople in Tunisia
Expatriate footballers in Montenegro
Cameroonian expatriate sportspeople in China
Cameroonian expatriate sportspeople in Croatia
Expatriate footballers in Egypt
UAE Pro League players